Calymmodon cucullatus is a species of grammitid fern. It is endemic to China.  Its natural habitat is subtropical or tropical moist lowland forests. It is threatened by habitat loss.

References

Polypodiaceae
Endemic flora of China
Ferns of Asia
Endangered flora of Asia
Taxonomy articles created by Polbot